The Scottish football league system is a series of generally connected leagues for Scottish football clubs.

The Scottish system is more complicated than many other national league systems, consisting of several completely separate systems or 'grades' of leagues and clubs. As well as senior football there is junior football, and also amateur football and welfare football.

In senior football in Scotland there is one national league, the Scottish Professional Football League (SPFL), which has four divisions. There are also several regional leagues (most notably the Highland Football League and since 2013 the Lowland Football League). From 2014–15, a promotion/relegation play-off between the two regional leagues and the SPFL national league was introduced for the first time.

Two clubs based in England play in the senior Scottish system - Berwick Rangers in the Lowland League and Tweedmouth Rangers in the East of Scotland League. A small number of English amateur clubs in the lowest levels of the game, based on or around the Anglo-Scottish border, also compete in Border Amateur Football League for geographical and travel reasons.

Men's system

Until 2013 Scottish football had no pyramid league system, and as a result it was impossible for clubs in regional leagues to progress into the national leagues, unless a vacancy opened in the Scottish Football League. The final example of this was ahead of the 2008–09 season, where Gretna's demise allowed Annan Athletic to take their place. Overall, the structure of men's football in Scotland was among the most fractured and multi-faceted in Europe, being unique in having a plurality of adult male governing bodies (with Seniors, Juniors, Amateurs and Welfarers - see below). It was not uncommon for a given town or county to have clubs in as many as three or four separate systems.

Moves towards creating a pyramid system began in 2008 under the tenure of Scottish Football Association (SFA) chief executive Gordon Smith, with discussions between the SFA and the regional and junior leagues. On 7 May 2013 Scottish Premier League clubs unanimously agreed on the introduction of a pyramid structure to Scottish football along with the reintroduction of a single governing body for the 42 clubs competing at a national level, a revised financial distribution model, and the possibility of a promotion/relegation play-off between the top two divisions.

Senior football

The current system has been in place since 2013–14, when the Scottish Professional Football League was formed by a merger of the Scottish Premier League (tier 1) and the Scottish Football League (tiers 2–4). At the same time, the Lowland Football League (tier 5) was founded, and from 2014 to 2021 the leagues below (tier 6) began to be incorporated as each joined the system. For each division, its official name, number of clubs, number of games, and promotion/relegation spots are given:

The leagues below level four are classed as "non-league football", meaning they are outside the Scottish Professional Football League and are played on a regional not a national basis. The Lowland League was created in 2013–14 and runs in parallel with the Highland League to form level five on the pyramid. Since 2014–15 the two league winners have played off against each other, with the winner then playing the team finishing 10th in League Two in a promotion/relegation play-off for a place in the SPFL. 

Below the Highland League is the Midlands League (19 clubs); North Caledonian Football League (13 teams, including two reserve teams); and the North Region League (30 clubs, 2 divisions). Below the Lowland League is the East of Scotland Football League (60 clubs, including one reserve team, 4 divisions); the South of Scotland Football League (12 clubs, including two reserve teams); and the West of Scotland Football League (79 clubs, 5 divisions).  At end of season, round robin promotion play-offs take place between the winners of feeder leagues of the Highland and Lowland League respectively (subject to each club meeting licensing criteria) for promotion to tier 5.

At the start of the 2022–23 season, this totalled 292 teams across 20 divisions.

Cup competitions 
All clubs in tier 5 and above automatically enter the Scottish Cup, along with clubs in other divisions who are full members of the Scottish Football Association. Up to three non-SFA members can qualify for the Scottish Cup each season by winning the East, South or West leagues, or the East, South and West Cup-Winners Shield. All 42 SPFL clubs compete in the Scottish League Cup, along with the Highland and Lowland champions, and one of the runners-up. The Scottish Challenge Cup features 30 SPFL clubs from outside the Premiership, Under 21s teams, and four from the Highland and Lowland leagues.

The SFA South Region Challenge Cup is for all 164 non-league clubs in the Lowland area (excluding reserve or B teams). The SFA North Region Challenge Cup existed between 2007 and 2009. There are also a variety of smaller cup tournaments at league and regional level.

Junior football

The Scottish Junior Football Association (SJFA) manages two regions: the SJFA East Region of 19 clubs; and the SJFA North Region of 34 clubs (4 clubs withdrew for 2022–23). This represents a total of 53 teams across 3 divisions. The term 'junior' refers not to the age of the players but the level of football played. These two regions joined the pyramid system at tier 6 below the Highland League in 2021–22.

Members of the SJFA, consisting of 114 teams in total from the two regions as well as the East of Scotland League and West of Scotland League (5 teams are in abeyance for 2022–23), participate in the Scottish Junior Cup. Up to three non-SFA members can qualify for the Scottish Cup each season by winning the Midlands League, North Superleague, or the Junior Cup. Banks O' Dee also enter senior tournaments in the Aberdeenshire Cup and Shield, and run an Under-20s team in the Senior development structure (the Aberdeenshire & District League).

In 2020, as part of a long process to form an integrated footballing pyramid structure, all 63 West Region Junior clubs decided to depart and join the newly founded West of Scotland Football League, a feeder to the Lowland League. Between 2017 and 2020 more than half of the East Region clubs departed the junior ranks, joining the senior East of Scotland Football League which is also below the Lowland League. The remaining clubs in the East Premiership South made the same move to the East of Scotland League for season 2021–22, and the East Premiership North clubs formed the Midlands League at tier 6 below the Highland League. The North Region also joined the pyramid structure at the same level. The northern leagues at that level entered the pyramid later in July.

Amateur football

Again separate from the above, and generally agreed to lie 'below' the senior and junior levels, are the hundreds of clubs in membership of the Scottish Amateur Football Association which oversees 50 leagues - although this includes Sunday League football and futsal competitions. Prestige centres around the historic Scottish Amateur Cup. A number of Senior and Junior clubs run reserve teams in Amateur football. Student and Police football is also affiliated to the SAFA.

As of 2022–23 there are 360 teams – in 12 geographic leagues containing a total of 31 league divisions – playing Saturday football under a regular August–May season. In addition there are 137 teams playing in four specialist Saturday Morning leagues (including one for Glasgow Colleges Amateur Football Association) in Dundee and Glasgow, plus 22 teams playing in Strathclyde Evangelical Churches Football League.

There are also 90 teams playing in the Summer Saturday leagues (season 2022), most of which are located in the Highland; 244 teams are in the Sunday League system.   Saturday Leagues (Winter) 

 Saturday Leagues (Summer) 

 Sunday Leagues

Welfare football

Roughly concurrent with the Scottish Amateur Football Association is the Scottish Welfare Football Association, which has a very low profile nationally. The SWFA was established in the aftermath of World War I, and oversees leagues mainly operating Sunday and summer or midweek football, predominantly in the north of Scotland.

From a peak of over 500 clubs, there were 158 teams in membership in November 2012, down from 238 teams in 2007.

As of Season 2022 (Summer) and 2022–23 (Winter) there are 100 teams in 8 geographic leagues, plus 13 clubs playing in Warriors Premier League.

Reserve and Youth football
The reserve and youth leagues are mostly governed by the relevant adult leagues.

Women's system

Senior football 
Senior leagues of women's football in Scotland are structured as follows:

Youth football

Cup competitions 
The Scottish Women's Cup is open to all senior teams affiliated with Scottish Women's Football. There are also the Scottish Women's Football League Cup, Scottish Women's Football League Plate, Scottish Women's Championship Cup, and Highlands & Islands League Cup.

See also

List of association football competitions
List of football clubs in Scotland

References

 
Scotland